Elvist Ciku (born 16 August 1986 in Shkodër, Albania) is an Albanian professional footballer who was last turning out for FC MAS Táborsko in the Czech Republic. Besides Albania, he has played in Poland and the Czech Republic.

Early life
Getting into football at the age of six with FK Vllaznia in his home country, Ciku moved to Greece in 1997 where he joined the youth ranks of AE Peristasi, living there for nine years crediting his success as a professional footballer to his father who succored him in his rise.

Career

In 2014, he signed for GKS Katowice.

Turning out for MFK Karviná of the Czech National Football League from 2009 to 2014, the Albanian midfielder got used to the climate there before transferring to GKS Katowice in Poland where he did not get paid for half a year despite a large fan support for the club. Ciku then ended up at FC MAS Táborsko, again in the Czech Republic, where he settled in well before departing in 2017.

References

External links 
 Elvist Ciku: Podhrotová pozice mi seed
 Fotbalista MFK OKD Elvist Ciku: Na jaře budeme lepší
 at Soccerway
 Czech Wikipedia Page

1986 births
Living people
Footballers from Shkodër
Albanian footballers
Association football midfielders
MFK Karviná players
GKS Katowice players
FC Silon Táborsko players
Albanian expatriate footballers
Expatriate footballers in Greece
Albanian expatriate sportspeople in Greece
Expatriate footballers in Poland
Albanian expatriate sportspeople in Poland
Expatriate footballers in the Czech Republic
Albanian expatriate sportspeople in the Czech Republic